Frank Horrigan may refer to:

 Frank Horrigan, aka Franky, (In the Line of Fire), main character in the 1993 film In the Line of Fire, portrayed by actor Clint Eastwood
 Frank Horrigan (Fallout), character in the computer game, Fallout 2 and a reference to the above character